Unaka National Forest was established by the U.S. Forest Service in North Carolina, 
On July 10, 1936, most of the forest was transferred to Pisgah National Forest, with the Virginia portion going to Jefferson National Forest, and the name was discontinued.

References

External links
Forest History Society
Listing of the National Forests of the United States and Their Dates (from the Forest History Society website) Text from Davis, Richard C., ed. Encyclopedia of American Forest and Conservation History. New York: Macmillan Publishing Company for the Forest History Society, 1983. Vol. II, pp. 743-788.

Former National Forests of the United States